The Romanian-language surname Moraru literally meaning "miller" may refer to:
Alexandru Moraru
Dumitru Moraru
Gabriel Moraru
Ion Moraru
Marin Moraru
Mihai Moraru
Mihail Moraru
Șerban Moraru
Teodor Moraru

Romanian-language surnames
Occupational surnames